The Ontong Java Plateau (OJP) is a massive oceanic plateau located in the southwestern Pacific Ocean, north of the Solomon Islands.
Two other southwestern Pacific plateaus, Manihiki and Hikurangi, now separated from the OJP by Cretaceous oceanic basins, are of similar age and composition and probably formed as a single plateau and a contiguous large igneous province together with the OJP.
The smooth surface of the OJP is punctuated by seamounts such as the Ontong Java Atoll, one of the largest atolls in the world.

Geological setting
It is bounded by Lyra Basin to the northwest, East Mariana Basin to the north, Nauru Basin to the northeast, and the Ellice Basin to the southeast. The OJP has collided with the Solomon Islands island arc and now lies on the inactive Vitiaz Trench and the Pacific–Australian plate boundary.

The maximum extent of the event can, however, be much larger since lavas in several surrounding basins are closely related to the OJP event and probably represent dike swarms associated with the formation of the OJP. These swarms or eruptions involved the Ontong Java-Manihiki-Hikurangi plateaus.

Tectonic evolution
OJP formed quickly over a mantle plume head, most likely the then newly formed Louisville hotspot, followed by limited volcanism for at least 30 million years.  The extant seamounts of the Louisville Ridge started to form 70 Ma and have a different isotopic composition, and therefore a shift in intensity and magma supply in the plume must have occurred before that.

The early, short-duration eruptions of OJP coincide with the global Early Aptian oceanic anoxic event (known as OAE1a or the Selli Event, 125.0–124.6 Ma) that led to the deposition of black shales during the interval 124–122 Ma.  Additionally, isotopic records of seawater in sediments have been associated with the 90 Ma OJP submarine eruptions.

About 80% of the OJP is being subducted beneath the Solomon Islands. Only the uppermost  of the crust is preserved on the Australian Plate.
The construction of Pliocene stratovolcanoes in the western end of the convergence zone has resulted in the New Georgia Islands and Bougainville Island. Shortening, uplift, and erosion of the northern Melanesian arc and the Malaita accretionary prism at deep levels has produced Guadalcanal, Makira, and Malaita.

References

Notes

Sources

Further reading
(Ocean Drilling Program: Volume 192 Scientific Results)

Large igneous provinces
Cretaceous volcanism
Plateaus of the Pacific Ocean
Volcanism of the Pacific Ocean
Volcanism of Oceania
Geology of the Solomon Islands